Mihaela Buzărnescu and Fanny Stollár were the defending champions, but only Stollár chose to defend her title, partnering Tímea Babos. Stollár lost in the semifinals to Katarzyna Piter and Kimberley Zimmermann.

Ekaterine Gorgodze and Oksana Kalashnikova won the title, defeating Piter and Zimmermann in the final, 1–6, 6–4, [10–6].

Seeds

Draw

Draw

References
Main draw

Budapest Grand Prix - Doubles
2022 Doubles